Begum Kulsoom Nawaz Sharif (Punjabi, ; 29 March 1948– 11 September 2018) was a Pakistani politician who had been the first lady of Pakistan  for three non-consecutive terms; from 1990 to 1993, 1997 to 1999 and then from 2013 to 2017. She was the President of Pakistan Muslim League (Nawaz) from 1999 to 2002.

Early and personal life

Kulsoom was born on 29 March 1948 in Lahore into the Punjabi Butt family, to Hafiz Butt. According to other sources, she was born on 22 March 1948.

She attended Islamia College and graduated from the Forman Christian College in Lahore. She received a master's degree in Urdu from the University of the Punjab in 1970. 

Kulsoom had two sisters and a brother. From her maternal side, she was the maternal granddaughter of the wrestler The Great Gama. She married Nawaz Sharif, the three-time Prime Minister of Pakistan, in April 1970. The couple have four children: Maryam, Asma, Hassan and Hussain.

Career

Spouse of the Prime Minister of Pakistan

Kulsoom became the first lady of Pakistan for the first time after her husband, Nawaz Sharif, became Prime Minister of Pakistan on 1 November 1990 when his party, Islami Jamhoori Ittehad, won 104 of 207 seats contested in the 1990 Pakistani general election. His first term as Prime Minister ended in July 1993.

She became first lady of Pakistan for the second time after Nawaz Sharif became Prime Minister of Pakistan when his party, Pakistan Muslim League (N), won the 1997 Pakistani general election. His second term as Prime Minister was ended when then Chief of Army Staff General Pervez Musharraf led a military coup d'état against him on 12 October 1999. Kulsoom was arrested by the Pakistan Army Corps of Military Police and immediately shifted to her local residence. According to her daughter, Maryam Nawaz, Kulsoom "dauntlessly challenged the usurper when a lot of men backed out". Nawaz Sharif named his wife as the President of Pakistan Muslim League in 1999.

In 2000, she led a public rally from Lahore to Peshawar to gather the public support for the PML-N. Soon after leaving her residence, her car was surrounded by the police and she was detained.

She remained president of the PML-N until 2002.

She became the first lady of Pakistan for the third time after Nawaz Sharif became Prime Minister of Pakistan when his party, Pakistan Muslim League (N), won the 2013 Pakistani general election.

Political career
Kulsoom was elected to the National Assembly of Pakistan  for the first time from NA-120 (Lahore-III) as a candidate of PML (N) in by-polls held in September 2017. She secured 59,413 votes and defeated Yasmin Rashid of Pakistan Tehreek-e-Insaf. The NA-120 seat fell vacant after her husband, Nawaz Sharif, was disqualified by the Supreme Court of Pakistan in the Panama Papers case.

She was unable to take oath as member of the National Assembly  due to her illness.

She was known for maintaining a low profile.

Death and funeral 
Nawaz was diagnosed with lymphoma in August 2017 and received treatment in London. She underwent several sessions of chemotherapy and radiotherapy during her illness.

In June 2018, Nawaz suffered cardiac arrest and was placed on a ventilator. On 10 September 2018, she was readmitted to the hospital and was put on the ventilator. She died on the  11 September 2018 at the age of 70 in London while both her husband Nawaz Sharif and daughter Maryam were serving jail terms. Her husband and daughter were granted timed-parole in order to attend her funeral.

On 13 September 2018, a funeral prayer for Nawaz was held in a Regent's Park mosque in London. Following which her body was flown from the Heathrow Airport to Lahore on a Pakistan International Airlines flight. On 14 September 2018, in Lahore, a funeral prayer led by Maulana Tariq Jameel was offered at Sharif Medical City around 5:30 pm PKT before she was laid to rest in Jati Umra.

References

1950 births
2018 deaths
Pakistan Muslim League (N) politicians
Pakistani expatriates in Saudi Arabia
Pakistani people of Kashmiri descent
Presidents of the Pakistan Muslim League (N)
Punjabi people
Spouses of prime ministers of Pakistan
Forman Christian College alumni
University of the Punjab alumni
People from Lahore
Sharif family
Deaths from cancer in England
Deaths from lymphoma
Pakistani MNAs 2013–2018